Extro may refer to:

 Extro, an alternative term for Outro
 Extro (novel), an alternative title for The Computer Connection by Alfred Bester